Iona is a settlement in southern Queens County, Prince Edward Island.

References

Communities in Queens County, Prince Edward Island